Sunridge Ski Area is a ski area located off of 17 Street in Edmonton, Alberta. It is built on the bank of the North Saskatchewan River.

History
The ski area was opened in 1980 as part of the Strathcona Science Provincial Park.  In 1983 the area was contracted to a private company and renamed Hidden Ridge Ski Area.  In 1988 the ski area management changed again, and was renamed to its current Sunridge Ski Area.

In 2007, following the addition of earth fill to the area between the original Orange and Red T-bars, the original Silverlode triple chairlift from Red Mountain Resort was installed.

References

External links
 Sunridge Ski Area
 Trail map

Ski areas and resorts in Alberta
Sports venues in Edmonton